Ryerson is a railway point and unincorporated place in the Unorganized North Part of Algoma District in northeastern Ontario, Canada. It lies on the Canadian Pacific Railway transcontinental main line between the settlements of Girdwood on the line  to the southwest and Swanson on the line  to the east. There is a siding at Ryerson, and Via Rail provides flag stop services with the Sudbury – White River train once daily in each direction. The place is adjacent to the eponymous Ryerson Creek and Ryerson Lake.

References

Communities in Algoma District